Alezzandrini syndrome is a very rare syndrome characterized by a unilateral degenerative retinitis, followed after several months by ipsilateral vitiligo on the face and ipsilateral poliosis.  Deafness may also be present.

See also 
 List of cutaneous conditions
 Skin lesion

References

External links 

Disturbances of human pigmentation
Rare syndromes
Syndromes affecting the retina
Syndromes affecting hearing
Syndromes affecting the skin